Van Riessen is a surname. Notable people with the surname include:

Hendrik van Riessen (1911–2000), Dutch philosopher
Laurine van Riessen (born 1987), Dutch speed skater and cyclist

See also
Riessen